Cheirostylis ovata, commonly known as the banded fleshy jewel orchid, is a species of orchid that is endemic Queensland where it grows in rainforest and moist woodland. It has between three and seven egg-shaped leaves and up to six small white flowers with two lobes on the end of the labellum.

Description 
The lateral sepals are a similar size to the dorsal sepal and the petals are the same length but about half as wide. Flowering occurs from August to October.

Taxonomy and naming
The banded fleshy jewel orchid was first formally described in 1896 by Frederick Manson Bailey who gave it the name Gastrodia ovata and published the name in the Department of Agriculture Botany Bulletin. In 1911, Rudolf Schlechter changed the name to Cheirostylis ovata. The specific epithet (ovata) is a Latin word meaning "egg-shaped".

Distribution and habitat
The banded fleshy jewel orchid grows in leaf litter and on rocks in rainforest and moist woodland between the Iron Range and Eungella.

References

Orchids of Queensland
Endemic orchids of Australia
Plants described in 1896
ovata